The Canon de 75 mm modèle 1908 was a French naval gun designed before World War I.  It served aboard the battleships of the Danton class.

Bibliography

External links 
 75 mm/62.5 (2.95") Model 1908 on Navweaps.com

Naval guns of France
World War I naval weapons
75 mm artillery